is a town located in Tagawa District, Fukuoka Prefecture, Japan.

As of 2016, the town has an estimated population of 10,712 and a density of 240 persons per km². The total area is 44.50 km².

References

External links

Kawara official website 

Towns in Fukuoka Prefecture